Lefkowitz v. Great Minneapolis Surplus Store, Inc 86 NW 2d 689 (Minn, 1957) is an American contract law case. It concerns the distinction between an offer and an invitation to offer. The case held that a clear, definite, explicit and non-negotiable advertisement constitutes an offer, acceptance of which creates a binding contract. Furthermore, it held that an advertisement which did not clarify the terms of its bargains, such as with fine print, could not then be modified with arbitrary house rules.

Facts
Great Minneapolis Surplus Store published an advertisement that said:

Saturday 9 A.M. Sharp 3 Brand New Fur Coats Worth to $100.00. First Come First Served $1 Each.

On April 13, they published another advertisement in the same newspaper, as follows.

Saturday 9 A.M. 2 Brand New Pastel Mink 3-Skin Scarfs
Selling for $89.50
Out they go Saturday. Each ... $1.00
1 Black Lapin Stole Beautiful, worth $139.50 ... $1.00
First Come First Served

Mr. Lefkowitz was the first person to come on the Saturday after seeing the advertisement. He said he was ready to pay $1. But each time the store owner refused to sell, saying there was a "house rule" that it was for women only. The same advertisement was published the next week, and he arrived again. He was told that he knew the house rules and he would not get the coat.

Judgment
Justice William P. Murphy (judge) held that the advertisement constituted an offer, which could not be withdrawn. He described the facts and gave his decision as follows.

See also
English contract law

References

United States contract case law